The Oligoflexia are a class of the phylum Bdellovibrionota. All species of this group are all Gram-negative.

References

 
Gram-negative bacteria